The 2011 Nigerian Senate election in Yobe State was held on April 9, 2011, to elect members of the Nigerian Senate to represent Yobe State. Bukar Ibrahim representing Yobe East, Ahmad Lawan representing Yobe North and Alkali Abdulkadir Jajere representing Yobe South all won on the platform of All Nigeria Peoples Party.

Overview

Summary

Results

Yobe East 
All Nigeria Peoples Party candidate Bukar Ibrahim won the election, defeating People's Democratic Party candidate Lawan Jaro Zarami and other party candidates.

Yobe North 
All Nigeria Peoples Party candidate Ahmad Lawan won the election, defeating People's Democratic Party candidate Hassan Kafayos Husseini and other party candidates.

Yobe South 
All Nigeria Peoples Party candidate Alkali Abdulkadir Jajere won the election, defeating People's Democratic Party candidate Adamu Garba Talba and other party candidates.

References 

April 2011 events in Nigeria
Yob
Yobe State Senate elections